Paloma Fabrykant (born December 7, 1981) is an Argentine mixed martial artist and journalist, based in Buenos Aires, Argentina.

Background
Fabrykant is from Buenos Aires she is the daughter of famous Argentine author Ana María Shua and Photographer Silvio Fabrykant. Whilst attending Colegio Nacional de Buenos Aires Paloma Fabrykant began martial arts training at 13 practising judo and aikido, she began her career as a professional writer, publishing her first two books before her teens (Things I hate, Ed. Abundant spring, 1998 and as mother of a teenage daughter, written by a teenage daughter, Ed. Planeta, 2001).

Her early talent for writing soon came to journalism, and while she was studying at the Faculty of Letters and Philosophy of the University of Buenos Aires, chronic wrote for the supplement of Clarin. At twenty years old she had her own regular column in Live, Sunday magazine of the same newspaper, and discovered the Karate, art was her greatest love ever since. But she failed to unite these two passions: journalism and martial arts. It was then that she met the kickboxer Jorge Acero Cali and started working as his press chief. As her client was gaining fame Fabrykant wrote for various media publications such as (Clarin, Pagina 12, Télam), a new form of struggle was growing at a rapid pace, threatening the reign of Kickboxing between combat sports. It was the mixed martial arts sport Fabrykant sponsored from the outset, advocating clean your -negative image in a principle-both in writing and on television (surcharge Radar, Live Journal, Telefe Noticias, Canal 26).

In an interview with Red Marcial stated..

MMA Journalism
In 2007 Paloma Fabrykant decided to take the big step: what better to spread the MMA to make her debut in the cage on TV. The "Vale Todo" program segment Chronicles Extreme, America 2 channel, devised, produced and starred Paloma was the first time the MMA appeared on broadcast TV in Argentina. The rating accompanied the news and came away. While she was in Thailand started training Muay Thai, The Department of Productions in Spanish UFC was alerted about her work, and when she returned to Buenos Aires, Paloma found a surprise: an invitation to Las Vegas to attend a UFC event and talk about possible collaborations.

Since 2008 worked as a correspondent for Fabrykant UFC, travelling Latin America and writing weekly reports on the progress of MMA in each country. At the same time she started working as a manager for, leading Argentine athletes, Uruguayans, Paraguayans, Peruvians and Costa Rica to compete in international events. Also in that year the practice of Jujitsu, studying art since at Gracie school found indispensable.
In 2010, the Space channel decided to begin broadcasting MMA Fabrykant for Latin America and the reporter was chosen for the specialized comments.

Paloma Fabrykant is currently a sports commentator for Fox Sports Latinoamérica and has been for the last 7 years in Argentina and a columnist for Télam.

Mixed martial arts career
Fabrykant started her mixed martial arts career in 2012 at the age of 30, by defeating Constanza Zoilo . She next defeated Cintia Candela Faria. She won her first four fights, before losing to Gloria Castillo.

Mixed martial arts record

|-
|Loss
|align="center" |4–2
|Flor Fonseca
|Decision (Split)
|Heroes - MMA 4
|
|align="center" | 3
|align="center" | 5:00
|Argentina
|
|-
|Loss
|align="center" |4–1
|Gloria Castillo
|Technical Submission (Armbar)
|AMMA - Arrogant MMA
|
|align="center" | 1
|align="center" | 0:53
|Buenos Aires, Argentina
|
|-
|Win
|align="center" |4–0
|Denise Boifer
|Submission (Rear-Naked Choke)
|Heroes - MMA 2
|
|align="center" | 1
|align="center" | 
|Argentina
|
|-
|Win
|align="center" |3–0
|Silvana Peralta
|Submission (Armbar)
|MRWF - Mixed Real World Fighters 1
|
|align="center" | 1
|align="center" | 1:15
|Santa Cruz, Argentina
|
|-
|Win
|align="center" |2–0
|Cintia Candela Faria
|TKO (Punches)
|KOCP - Knock Out Club Productions
|
|align="center" | 1
|align="center" | 3:50
|Gualeguaychu, Argentina
|
|-
|Win
|align="center" |1–0
|Constanza Zoilo
|TKO (Punches)
|GEF - Gualeguaychu Extreme Fights
|
|align="center" | 2
|align="center" | 1:59
|Gualeguaychu, Argentina
|
|}

See also
 Lists of writers

References

External links
 
 
 
 
 
 

1981 births
Sportspeople from Buenos Aires
Argentine female mixed martial artists
Argentine practitioners of Brazilian jiu-jitsu
Female Brazilian jiu-jitsu practitioners
Argentine female karateka
Argentine jujutsuka
Argentine Jews
Argentine women writers
Living people
Jewish Argentine writers
Argentine journalists
Writers from Buenos Aires
Flyweight mixed martial artists
Mixed martial artists utilizing karate
Mixed martial artists utilizing jujutsu
Mixed martial artists utilizing Brazilian jiu-jitsu
Argentine television journalists
Mixed martial arts broadcasters
University of Buenos Aires alumni
Women television journalists